Żelichowo  is a village in the administrative district of Gmina Nowy Dwór Gdański, within Nowy Dwór Gdański County, Pomeranian Voivodeship, in northern Poland.

Before 1772 the area was part of Kingdom of Poland, 1772-1919 Prussia and Germany, 1920-1939 Free City of Danzig, September 1939 - February 1945 German Reich. For the history of the region, see History of Pomerania.

The village was founded in 1328. In 1768 a Catholic chapel was built (also used by Mennonites), which burned down in 1778 and has not been rebuilt. In 1776, there were 63 names of Mennonites. In 1820, 366 people lived in Petershagen and Pendelmuehle, including 208 Mennonites. The petition from 1868 signed Mennonite Jacob Wiens from this village. The area of the village was at the time 87 voloks (1 volok = 17.9550 ha) and 4 morgens (1 Kulmer Morgen = 0.560117 ha), 60 houses stood there, and among 472 residents, 143 were Mennonites.

The village had a population of 510 in 2008.

References

Villages in Nowy Dwór Gdański County
Mennonitism in Poland
Vistula delta Mennonites